Bellanger is a surname. Notable people with the surname include:

Florian Bellanger (born 1968), French pastry chef
Pierre Bellanger (born 1958), Founder and CEO of Skyrock

See also
Bélanger
Pont-Bellanger, a commune in Calvados, France